Chonaphe is a genus of millipedes belonging to the family Xystodesmidae.

The species of this genus are found in Russian Far East and Western North America.

Species:

Chonaphe armata 
Chonaphe cygneia 
Chonaphe eruca 
Chonaphe evexa 
Chonaphe patriotica 
Chonaphe remissa 
Chonaphe schizoterminalis 
Chonaphe serratus

References

Xystodesmidae